Raziel, ( Rāzīʾēl, "God is my Mystery")   is an angel within the teachings of Jewish mysticism (of the Kabbalah of Judaism) who is the "Angel of Secrets" and the "Angel of Mysteries”. He is also called "Keeper of All Magic." He is one of the angels associated with the sephirah Chokhmah of Kabbalah, alongside Jophiel.

Mysticism and tradition
Various teachings assign Raziel to diverse roles, including that of a cherub, a member of the Ophanim, and chief of the Erelim.

Raziel, known as "Revealer of The Rock" and is described as the "Ruling Prince of the 2nd Heaven". He is said to expound the clear teachings of the
"Torah's divine wisdom" and protects the ministering angels from the living creatures that uphold the universe.

Authorship of Sefer Raziel HaMalakh

The famous Sefer Raziel HaMalakh ("Book of Raziel the Angel") attributed to this figure is said to contain all secret knowledge, and is considered to be a book of magic. He stands close by God's throne, and therefore hears and writes down everything that is said and discussed. He purportedly gave the book to Adam and Eve after they ate from the forbidden tree of the knowledge of good and evil (that resulted in their expulsion from the Garden of Eden) so the two could find their way back "home" and better understand their God. Raziel's fellow angels were deeply disturbed by this, and thus stole the book from Adam and threw it into the ocean. God Himself decided not to punish Raziel, but instead retrieved the book by means of the Rahab and returned it to Adam and Eve.

According to some sources, the book was passed on through the generations to Enoch (In 3 Enoch believed to have later become the angel Metatron), who may have incorporated his own writings into the tome. From Enoch, the archangel Raphael gave it to Noah, who used the wisdom within to build Noah's Ark. The Book of Raziel was said to have come into the possession of King Solomon, and a number of texts claiming to be this volume have appeared.

In popular culture 

 In japanese light novel series Date A Live, Raziel is the name of a spiritual weapon (referred to as Angels within the series), belonging to Nia Honjou. Raziel is a book containing all knowledge of past and present, as well as capable of manifesting anything written in it as reality.
 In Cassandra Clare's The Shadowhunter Chronicles, the angel Raziel is responsible for the creation of the race of Shadowhunters by mixing his blood with mortal men. He also appears as a character within the narrative of the original hexalogy.
 In the video game series "Soul Reaver", Raziel is the name of a vampire and the most trusted lieutenant of Kain. After his supposed hubris of suprassing his master, Raziel is thrown into the abyss to be forever consumed and is reborn as a Soul Reaver, a wraith that consumes souls.

See also
Angel
List of angels in theology
Jewish mysticism
Kabbalah
Sephiroth

References

External links
The Full Hebrew only Sefer Raziel Amsterdam Edition in pdf free download  (PDF)

Individual angels
Angels in Judaism